Petron Corporation is the largest oil refining and marketing company in the Philippines, supplying more than a third of the country's oil requirements. From the refinery, Petron moves its products mainly by sea to 32 depots and terminals throughout the country.

History
Petron's history dates back to September 7, 1933, when Socony-Vacuum Oil Company (Standard Oil of New York) and Standard Oil of New Jersey (also known as Jersey Standard) merged their interests in the Far East into a 50–50 joint venture named the Standard Vacuum Oil Company (Stanvac). It operated in 50 countries, including the Philippines, New Zealand, China, and the region of East Africa.

In 1953, the Philippine national government, partly to promote Claro M. Recto's national industrialization program and partly to respond to increasing international oil prices, attempted to launch a national oil company that caters Filipino consumers with affordable petroleum products. In 1957, Stanvac won the concession to build and operate a refinery in Bataan. For this purpose, FilOil Refinery Corporation was established in 1959.

In 1962, Stanvac was dissolved and the marketing and refining interests were divided between the former partners. Esso Philippines, Inc. took over Stanvac's Philippine operations, including FilOil Refinery Corporation. Esso was a trade name used by Standard Oil of New Jersey.

In 1973, the Philippine government, through the Philippine National Oil Company (PNOC), acquired Esso Philippines, Inc., including FilOil Refinery Corporation.  Esso Philippines, Inc. was renamed Petrophil Corporation (Petrophil) and by 1974, Esso filling stations were rebranded as "Petron", a portmanteau of petroleum (PET) and research octane number (RON). Subsequently, Mobil (successor of Socony-Vacuum Oil Company) also sold its share in FilOil Refinery Corporation to PNOC. The oil refining and marketing units in PNOC, including FilOil Refinery Corporation, were merged into Petrophil Corporation. In 1988, Petrophil Corporation was renamed Petron Corporation.

As part of the government's privatization program, PNOC sought a strategic partner that would give Petron a reliable supply of oil, plus access to state-of-the-art refining technology. The result was a partnership with the world's largest oil producer, Saudi Aramco. On February 3, 1994, PNOC and Aramco Overseas Co. B.V. signed a share purchase agreement that gave both an equal 40% stake in Petron Corporation. The remaining 20% of Petron shares were sold to the public.

On August 11, 2006, a Petron oil tanker Solar 1, carrying fuel oil sank, causing the Guimaras oil spill, the biggest oil spill in Philippine history.

In 2008, Saudi Aramco sold its entire stake to the Ashmore Group, a London-listed investment group.  Ashmore acquired an additional 11% when it made a required tender offer to other shareholders.  By July 2008, Ashmore, through its SEA Refinery Holdings B.V., had a 50.57 percent of Petron's stock. Ashmore's payment was made in December 2008. In December 2008, Ashmore acquired PNOC's 40% stake. In the same month, San Miguel Corporation (SMC) said it was in the final stages of negotiations with the Ashmore Group to buy up to 50.1 percent of Petron. In 2010, SMC acquired majority control of Petron Corporation.

In January 2013, Petron officially opened their Malaysian operations, rebranding all Esso and Mobil stations across Peninsular Malaysia.

On November 9, 2021, SMC CEO Ramon Ang offered to sell Petron back to the government in response to calls for re-nationalization due to rising fuel costs.

Products and services

The company's ISO-14001-certified refinery processes crude oil into a full range of petroleum products, including LPG, gasoline, diesel, jet fuel, kerosene, industrial fuel oil, solvents, asphalts and mixed xylene. Petron's lube oil blending plant produces mechanical lubricants and grease. These products are also sold through service stations and sales centers, and directly to industrial customers with the largest client being the power sector. Petron also supplies jet fuels to international and domestic carriers.

Through more than 1,200 service stations, they retail gasoline, diesel and kerosene to motorists and public transport operators. They also sell their LPG brand Gasul to households and other consumers through an extensive dealership network.

Petron opened its first fuel additives blending plant in the Asia-Pacific region at the Subic Bay Freeport Zone in November 2008. The plant has the capacity to blend 12,000 metric tons (MT) of fuel additives per year. In 2006, the facility was constructed in partnership with Innospec. As part of the agreement.

In April 2008, Petron commissioned the country's first petrochemical feedstock units, at its -per-day Bataan Refinery.

The feedstock unit converts black products (fuel oil) into LPG, gasoline, and diesel. It also purifies propylene to manufacture food packaging, appliances, suitcases, furniture, DVDs and car parts.

Sports teams
 Petron Blaze Spikers
 Petron Blaze Boosters

See also
 Petron Megaplaza
 List of gas station chains in the Philippines

References

External links
 

Oil and gas companies of the Philippines
San Miguel Corporation subsidiaries
Companies based in Mandaluyong
Energy companies established in 1933
Non-renewable resource companies established in 1933
Philippine brands
1994 initial public offerings
Companies listed on the Philippine Stock Exchange
Philippine companies established in 1933
Former ExxonMobil subsidiaries
Gas stations in the Philippines